Sensation in San Remo is a 1951 West German musical comedy film directed by Georg Jacoby and starring Marika Rökk, Peter Pasetti and Ewald Balser. It was one of Rökk's most successful post-war films. The film is partly set at the Sanremo Festival in Italy. It was shot at the Bendestorf Studios with location shooting taking place on the Italian Riviera in the vicinity of Sanremo.  It was made in Agfacolor. The film's sets were designed by the art director Erich Kettelhut.

Synopsis
Cornelia is a respectable but prudish teacher in a girls' school by day and a night a performer in nightclubs. She has only taken this second job in order to raise money to help her family, but keeps it secret from both them and her headmaster. Cornelia falls in love with a young composer and accompanies him on a tour of the Italian resorts, where she encounters her headmaster who is there attending a conference.

Cast
Marika Rökk as Cornelia
Peter Pasetti as Valenta
Ewald Balser as Prof. Feldmann
Elisabeth Markus as Prof. Feldmann's wife
Petra Unkel as Barbara
Walter Giller as Ernst
Otto Gebühr as director Koch
Dorit Kreysler as Lydia Leer
Gertrud Wolle as Frau Koch
Harald Paulsen as manager Kastillioni
Arno Assmann as theater director Nahrhaft
Horst Beck as Det. Lobgesang
Helmut Peine as school servant
Justus Ott as antiquarian
Harry Gondi as Geschaeftsberater in der Bar
Inge Meysel as secretary
Jutta Petrikowsky as nurse
Austin Carlile as Squidgy
 Maria Litto as 	Dancer

References

Bibliography 
 Bruns, Jana Francesca . Nazi Cinema's New Women: Marika Roekk, Zarah Leander, Kristina Soederbaum. Stanford University, 2002.

External links

West German films
German musical comedy films
1951 musical comedy films
Films directed by Georg Jacoby
Films set in Italy
Films about singers
1950s German films
Films shot in Italy
1950s German-language films